Angelica is an album by American guitarist Nels Cline which was released in 1988 by Enja Records.

Track listing
 Angel Of Death - 8:12
 Maria Alone (For Maria Farandouri) - 8:17
 The Lung (For Vinny Golia) - 8:44
 Bandoneon (For Dino Saluzzi) - 6:03
 Fives & Sixes (For Booker Little) - 10:54
 Jara (For Victor Jara) - 8:30

Personnel
 Nels Cline – acoustic and electric guitars
 Stacy Rowles – trumpet, flugelhorn
 Tim Berne – alto saxophone
 Eric Von Essen – bass, harmonica
 Alex Cline – drums, percussion
 Vinny Golia – producer

References

1988 albums
Nels Cline albums